Major League Baseball (MLB) has played multiple regular season games outside of its base in the United States and Canada. Listed below are the results of those games. Exhibition contests, such as preseason games or postseason all-star games, are not included.

List of games

Notes
 The March 2008 games were known as the MLB Japan Opening Series 2008.
 The March 21, 2019, contest was the last professional game for Ichiro Suzuki, who announced his retirement immediately afterwards.
 The June 2019 games were part of the 2019 MLB London Series.
 There has been one no-hitter: May 4, 2018 (detail).
 There has been one extra innings game: March 21, 2019 (12 innings).

Canceled games
In May 2019, MLB announced that the Chicago Cubs and St. Louis Cardinals would play a two-game series in London in June 2020, to be known as the 2020 MLB London Series. Additionally, in December 2019, the league announced that the Arizona Diamondbacks and San Diego Padres would play a two-game series in Mexico City in April 2020. These would have been the first regular-season MLB games in Mexico City. Both of these series were cancelled due to the COVID-19 pandemic.

Games played in Puerto Rico
Estadio Hiram Bithorn in San Juan, Puerto Rico, has hosted 49 MLB games since 2001. As Puerto Rico is a United States commonwealth, these games are not included in the above table. 

The Montreal Expos played 43 "home" games at Estadio Hiram Bithorn during 2003 and 2004.

Excluding Expos games, below is a list of neutral-site games played in Puerto Rico:

In August 2019, MLB announced a three-game series between the New York Mets and Miami Marlins at Estadio Hiram Bithorn to be played in April 2020. However, this series was cancelled due to the COVID-19 pandemic.

Upcoming games abroad

In 2022, MLB announced a plan to have additional games played internationally, including regular-season games in Tokyo, Mexico City, London, and Paris between 2023 and 2026.

In August 2022, MLB announced its first "Mexico City Series": the San Francisco Giants and San Diego Padres will play a two-game series at Estadio Alfredo Harp Helú in April 2023. The Padres will be designated as the "home" team for both games. These will be the first regular-season games to be played in Mexico City.

As part of the collective bargaining agreement to end the 2021–22 Major League Baseball lockout, MLB agreed to host games at the Stade de France, just outside Paris, starting in 2025. The games will be the first MLB regular-season games to be contested in mainland Europe. 

The new Stade de France series is intended to alternate with the MLB London Series, which began in 2019 and which is scheduled to resume in 2023 following a three-season pause due to the COVID-19 pandemic. MLB will play games in London in 2023 and 2024, followed by Paris in 2025, and then in London again in 2026.

The Los Angeles Dodgers and the New York Yankees have informed MLB that they would like to participate in the 2025 Paris games.

See also
1999 Baltimore Orioles–Cuba national baseball team exhibition series, which included a March 1999 exhibition game played in Cuba
MLB China Series, two 2008 spring training games
MLB Home Run Derby X, an exhibition tour held since 2022
MLB Japan All-Star Series, postseason all-star contests held periodically since 1986
MLB Taiwan All-Star Series, postseason all-star contests held in 2011
List of neutral site regular season Major League Baseball games played in the United States and Canada

References

External links
MLB International

Major League Baseball international baseball competitions
+
Major League Baseball lists